The 2011–12 season of the Hessenliga was the fourth season of the league at tier five (V) of the German football league system.

The champions, 1. FC Eschborn, were promoted to the 2012–13 Regionalliga Südwest. Viktoria Aschaffenburg exchanged their membership of the Hessischer Fußball-Verband (HFV; Hessian Football Association) for the Bavarian Football Association and were promoted one tier to the newly established Fußball-Regionalliga Bayern. Rot-Weiss Frankfurt and Eintracht Wetzlar were relegated to their respective Verbandsligen. 1. FCA Darmstadt took on the runners-up of the Verbandsligen Nord (TSV Lehnerz), Mitte (FC 1931 Eddersheim) and Süd (Kickers Obertshausen), finished first in the group, and thus secured their place in the 2012–13 Hessenliga along with second-placed FC 1931 Eddersheim.

League table

References

External links 
 Hessischer Fußball-Verband – official website of the Hessian Football Association 

Hessenliga seasons
Hessen